Gordon Allan Wilson (born August 13, 1932) is a Canadian retired professional ice hockey player who played two playoff games in the National Hockey League with the Boston Bruins during the 1954–55 season. The rest of his career, which lasted from 1952 to 1960, was spent in the minor leagues. Wilson's father, Phat Wilson, was an amateur hockey player and is a member of the Hockey Hall of Fame.

Career statistics

Regular season and playoffs

External links
 

1932 births
Living people
Boston Bruins players
Canadian ice hockey left wingers
Hershey Bears players
Ice hockey people from Ontario
Quebec Aces (AHL) players
Quebec Aces (QSHL) players
Sportspeople from Thunder Bay
Vancouver Canucks (WHL) players